Nathipalayam is a panchayat village in Gobichettipalayam taluk in Erode District of Tamil Nadu state, India. It is about 5 km from Gobichettipalayam and 37 km from district headquarters Erode. The village is located on the road connecting Gobichettipalayam with Perundurai. Nathipalayam has a population of about 1330.

References

Villages in Erode district